Miss Mato Grosso do Sul is a Brazilian Beauty pageant which selects the representative for the State of Mato Grosso do Sul at the Miss Brazil contest. The pageant was created in 1979 and has been held every year since with the exception of 1990-1991, 1993, and 2020. The pageant is held annually with representation of several municipalities. Since 2021, the State director of Miss Mato Grosso do Sul is, Muryllo Lorensoni. 

The following women from who competed as Miss Mato Grosso do Sul have won Miss Brazil:

, from Dourados, in 1998

Results Summary

Placements
Miss Brazil:  (1998)
1st Runner-Up: Denize Demirdjian (1983)
2nd Runner-Up: Ana Cristina Cestari (1986)
3rd Runner-Up: Ana Carina Góis Homa (1996); Rhaíssa Espindola Siviero Olmedo (2006)
4th Runner-Up: 
Top 5/Top 7/Top 8: 
Top 10/Top 11/Top 12: Vânia Regina Torraca (1979); Rossana S. Justiniano (1984); Deusa Aparecida Ottoni (1989); Flávia Roberta Lopes (1994); Letícia de Souza Ávila (2002); Raíza Machado Vidal (2011)
Top 15/Top 16: Pilar Velásquez (2009); Kátia Martins Talon (2010); Patrícia Machry Barbosa (2013)

Special Awards
Miss Photogenic: 
Miss Congeniality:

Titleholders
The titleholders for Miss Mato Grosso do Sul since 1979. There were women from the state that competed for Miss Brazil before 1979 but they competed as Miss Mato Grosso as Mato Grosso and Mato Grosso do Sul were once one state called Mato Grosso. Women that competed in Miss Brazil before 1979 are included in the Miss Mato Grosso article due to them being Miss Mato Grosso and not Miss Mato Grosso do Sul.

Table Notes

References

External links
Official Miss Brasil Website

Women in Brazil
Mato Grosso do Sul
Miss Brazil state pageants